José de Jesús García (born 22 June 1968) is a Mexican boxer. He competed in the men's bantamweight event at the 1988 Summer Olympics.

References

1968 births
Living people
Mexican male boxers
Olympic boxers of Mexico
Boxers at the 1988 Summer Olympics
Place of birth missing (living people)
Bantamweight boxers